Divisional general Carlos Alberto dos Santos Cruz (born 1 June 1952) is a Brazilian military officer who previously held the post of Force Commander of the United Nations' peacekeeping force in the Democratic Republic of the Congo (known by its acronym, MONUSCO). He was appointed to this position by United Nations Secretary-General Ban Ki-moon on 17 May 2013 and replaced by Derrick Mbuyiselo Mgwebi on 29 December 2015. He was Minister-Secretary of Government of Brazil, nominated by President Jair Bolsonaro, from 1 January 2019 to 13 June 2019.

Biography
His grandfather emigrated from Vila Nova de Cerveira, Portugal in 1921 at the age of 22. He is of Quadroon stock on his grandmother's side. His mother is of Portuguese Nobility origin from Bahia. A graduate of the Military Academy of Agulhas Negras 1974 Promotion (Resende, Rio de Janeiro) and the Catholic University of Campinas, Santos Cruz has more than 40 years of national and international military experience. He served as Deputy Commander for Land Operations of the Brazilian Army from April 2011 and March 2013.  He also served as Special Adviser to the Minister for the Secretariat of Strategic Affairs within the Presidency of Brazil.

Santos Cruz served as Force Commander of the United Nations Stabilization Mission in Haiti (MINUSTAH) between January 2007 and April 2009. In April 2013, he received command of United Nations Organization Stabilization Mission in the Democratic Republic of the Congo (MONUSCO). Santos Cruz commanded MONUSCO during the M23 rebellion and was praised for providing "strong backing" to the UN forces engaged alongside Congolese government forces.

In August 2022, Santos Cruz was appointed by United Nations Secretary-General António Guterres to lead the United Nations fact-finding mission regarding the Olenivka prison massacre, together with Ingibjörg Sólrún Gísladóttir and Issoufou Yacouba.

References

Further reading
 Lt Gen Carlos Santos Cruz: We will go after those who are committing crimes against the population
 MONUSCO Senior Military Command meet over civilian protection and security issues

|-

|-

1952 births
Brazilian generals
People from Rio Grande do Sul
Government ministers of Brazil
Recipients of the Order of Military Merit (Brazil)
Recipients of the Order of Naval Merit (Brazil)
Living people
United Nations military personnel
United Nations operations in the Democratic Republic of the Congo
People of the M23 rebellion
Brazilian officials of the United Nations
Podemos (Brazil) politicians